Shellness is a small coastal hamlet on the most easterly point of the Isle of Sheppey in the Borough of Swale in the English county of Kent. The settlement forms part of the parish of Leysdown.

Hamlets in Kent
Isle of Sheppey
Headlands of Kent